Marc Picard (born April 25, 1955) is a politician in the province of Quebec, Canada.  He currently represents the Chutes-de-la-Chaudière district at the National Assembly of Quebec as a member of the CAQ.

Born in Saint-Raphaël (Bellechasse), Quebec, Picard has a college diploma in business administration for the Cégep de Lévis-Lauzon and worked for the Quebec Ministry of Revenue for 25 years as a research officer. He also studied accounting at Université Laval. He also worked for the Canadian Mental Health Association and the Saint-Jean-Chrysostome Helping Agency

In 1999, Picard was elected to the council of the town of Saint-Jean-Chrysostome.  Two years later, the provincial government merged a number of municipal governments including the one of Saint-Jean-Chrysostome to the city of Lévis.  Picard served on the new city council until he won a seat to the provincial legislature for the Action démocratique du Québec (ADQ).

Picard was first elected as a Member of the National Assembly in the 2003 election.

In 2007, Picard was easily re-elected with 59% of the vote.  Parti Québécois (PQ) candidate and former Bloc Québécois member of the House of Commons of Canada, Yvan Loubier, finished second with 18% of the vote.

On May 8, 2007, Picard became Third Deputy Speaker of the House.

In the 2008 election, Picard won re-election with 45% of the vote, even though his party's support sharply declined.

On August 22, 2009, he issued his support for Éric Caire in the leadership race of the ADQ. Following Caire's defeat, he and Caire left the ADQ, complaining of the attitude of victor Gilles Taillon. On December 19, 2011 he joined the CAQ.

External links
 Official website

Footnotes

1955 births
Action démocratique du Québec MNAs
French Quebecers
Independent MNAs in Quebec
Living people
People from Lévis, Quebec
Coalition Avenir Québec MNAs
Vice Presidents of the National Assembly of Quebec
21st-century Canadian politicians